Tiiu Nurmberg (born 5 January 1982 in Pointe-Claire, Canada) is a former Canadian alpine skier of Estonian descent, who represented Estonia at the 2006 and 2010 Winter Olympics.

Her best place in the Olympics was 34th in giant slalom in 2006 Winter Olympics.

She ended her career on 14 April 2010.

References

1982 births
Living people
Alpine skiers at the 2006 Winter Olympics
Alpine skiers at the 2010 Winter Olympics
Olympic alpine skiers of Estonia
Estonian female alpine skiers
Canadian female alpine skiers
People from Pointe-Claire
Canadian people of Estonian descent